The 2013 Dominion Men's NOCA (Northern Ontario Curling Association) Provincial Curling Championship was held February 6–10 at the Nipigon Curling Club in Nipigon.  The winning team of Brad Jacobs represented Northern Ontario at the 2013 Tim Hortons Brier in Edmonton, Alberta.

Qualification
Nine teams qualify for the Northern Ontario men's provincial. The methods of qualification and the teams that qualifier are as follows:

Teams
Participating teams are as follows:

Standings

Scores

Draw 1
February 6, 14:30

Bonot 11-5 Dumontelle
Currie 5-2 Jakubo
Gordon 6-3 Burgess
Jacobs 7-3 Chandler

Draw 2
February 6, 19:30

Jacobs 5-4 Gordon
Burgess 7-6 Jakubo
Bonot 6-4 Currie
Hackner 7-2 Dumontelle

Draw 3
February 7, 09:30

Jakubo 8-4 Hackner
Dumontelle 7-5 Gordon
Currie 10-5 Chandler
Jacobs 7-2 Burgess

Draw 4
February 7, 14:30

Burgess 8-5 Chandler
Gordon 7-5 Currie
Dumontelle 11-7 Jakubo
Hackner 7-3 Bonot

Draw 5
February 7, 19:30

Bonot 8-6 Gordon
Hackner 5-4 Chandler
Jacobs 7-4 Dumontelle
Burgess 8-5 Currie

Draw 6
February 8, 09:30

Jacobs 9-4 Currie
Dumontelle 8-4 Chandler
Gordon 7-6 Hackner
Jakubo 5-1 Bonot

Draw 7
February 8, 14:30

Jakubo 6-2 Chandler
Jacobs 2-1 Bonot
Hackner 5-4 Burgess
Currie 8-2 Dumontelle

Draw 8
February 8, 19:30

 Burgess 7-3 Dumontelle
 Jacobs 8-7 Hackner
 Chandler 8-4 Bonot
 Gordon 9-8 Jakubo

Draw 9
February 9, 09:00

 Hackner 5-2 Currie
 Burgess 6-3 Bonot
 Jacobs 7-2 Jakubo
 Gordon 7-4 Chandler

Playoffs

Semifinal
February 9, 19:30

Final
February 10, 14:30

References 

Northern Ontario Men's Curling Championship
Curling in Northern Ontario
Sport in Thunder Bay District
Northern Ontario Men's Curling Championship